Adrian Pukanych (born 22 June 1983) is a professional Ukrainian football midfielder who plays for Epitsentr Dunaivtsi.

International career 
He played for Ukraine national under-21 football team and also played in the 2006 UEFA European Under-21 Football Championship, helping his side reach the final. He also was called up to Ukraine national football team for two matches and scored one goal.

International goals
Scores and results list Ukraine's goal tally first.

Honours

Team 

 Ukrainian Premier League: champion 2005
 Ukrainian Premier League: runner-up 2003, 2004
 Ukrainian Cup: winner 2004
 Ukrainian Cup: runner-up 2003, 2005

Ukraine under-21
 UEFA Under-21 Championship runner-up: 2006

References

External links 
 
 

1983 births
Living people
Ukrainian footballers
Ukraine international footballers
Ukraine under-21 international footballers
Ukrainian Premier League players
FC Shakhtar Donetsk players
FC Shakhtar-2 Donetsk players
FC Shakhtar-3 Donetsk players
FC Vorskla Poltava players
FC Mariupol players
FC Polissya Zhytomyr players
FC Hoverla Uzhhorod players
FC Shukura Kobuleti players
Ukrainian expatriate footballers
Expatriate footballers in Georgia (country)
Ukrainian expatriate sportspeople in Georgia (country)
FC Uzhhorod players
FC Epitsentr Dunaivtsi players
Association football midfielders